The first season of Arab Idol was launched on MBC 1 on 9 December 2011. MBC decided to launch a more stylish version of Pop Idol after the 5 seasons of Super Star, the previous Arabic license of the show. The season was presented by Lebanese model Annabella Hilal and Kuwaiti actor Abdallah Tulehi. The judging panel consisted of Lebanese singer Ragheb Alama, Emirati diva Ahlam and Egyptian music producer, record producer and musician Hassan El Shafei. On finale night, 24 March 2012, Carmen Suleiman from Egypt was crowned the winner of the first season of Arab Idol in a tough competition against Dounia Batma from Morocco. The high ranking of this first season encouraged MBC to launch a second season in 2013.

Auditions 
In July 2011, the following audition cities were revealed on the official MBC 1 website, and in August the dates were revealed.

Cairo, Egypt, 4 September 2011
Casablanca, Morocco, 8 September 2011
Dubai, United Arab Emirates, 15 September 2011
Kuwait City, Kuwait, 19 September 2011
Amman, Jordan, 26 September 2011
London, UK, 1 October 2011
Tunis, Tunisia, 5 October 2011
Beirut, Lebanon, 14 October 2011
Damascus, Syria auditions were originally scheduled for 26 September 2011, but the city was excluded after political unrest in the country.

Top 20 
On 13 January 2012, the hand-picked Top 20 was revealed. Representing 9 Arab countries are:

From Egypt: Carmen Suleiman (17), Yahya Yacoub (27), Rasha Sharnoubi (22), Shaza Youssef (17), Karim Mohammad (24)
From Tunisia: Hassan Kharbech (23), Ghofran Fatouhi (19), Shirine Ljmi (16), Amin Bourguiba (17)
From Morocco: Dounia Batma (20), Imane Karkibou (23), Habiba Bouziri (23)
From Jordan: Youssef Arafat (18), Ghazal Shashaah (23)
From Saudi Arabia: Mohamed Taher (23), Marwan Fagui (24)
From Iraq: Mohammad Oulwan (20)
From Oman: Mahmoud Noufli (21)
From Palestine: Ahmad Abbasi (25)
From Syria: Nadia Manfoukh (28)

Top 10

Repertoire 

Week 1 (27 January 2012)
 Guest/Mentor: Saber Rebaï

Week 2 (3 February 2012)
 Guest/Mentor: Sherine

Week 3 (10 February 2012)
 Guest/Mentor: Assi El Helani

Week 4 (17 February 2012)
 Guest/Mentor: Majid Al Muhandis

Week 5 (24 February 2012)
 Guest/Mentor: Nawal Al Zoghbi

Week 6 (2 March 2012)
 Guest/Mentor: Elissa (singer)

Week 7 (9 March 2012)
 Guest/Mentor: Kadim Al Sahir

Week 8 (16 March 2012)
 Guest/Mentor: Nancy Ajram

Week 9 (23 March 2012)
 Guest/Mentor: Najwa Karam / Latifa (singer)

2011 Lebanese television seasons
2012 Lebanese television seasons
Idols (franchise)